Kickin' Out the Footlights...Again is a studio album by American country music artists George Jones and Merle Haggard, released in 2006.

Background
Jones and Haggard had previously recorded one album together in 1982, A Taste of Yesterday's Wine, which produced the number one single "Yesterday's Wine". Their friendship stretched much farther back, however, to when Jones first heard the Haggard-penned "I Threw Away the Rose," which rose to number 2. In his 1981 autobiography Merle Haggard: Sing Me Back Home, Haggard recalls playing somewhere  in Texas when  someone handed him a phone saying Jones was on the line. Jones slurred his appreciation for the song and said he was coming to see him immediately. "It wasn't hard to see that ol' George was pretty wasted," Haggard wrote. "I hung up the phone and some of the others in the room said they wouldn't be surprised if he showed up. I told them I didn't think so, 'cause hell, he was supposed to be doing concerts all week." The next day Jones arrived, kicking the door in and eventually folding up the roll-away bed that Haggard's sleeping manager Fuzzy Owen was on and wheeling it out of the room. Jones would record "I Threw Away the Rose" himself, as well as several other Haggard compositions over the course of his career, and say repeatedly over the years that, next to Hank Williams, Haggard was his favorite singer.

In 1996, Jones was a surprise guest on an episode of TNN's Prime Time Live that was saluting Haggard and, in 1997, Jones and Haggard performed a rendition of "The Way I Am" together on another TV special honoring Haggard called Workin' Man - A Tribute. A year later Haggard returned the favor by appearing on The George Jones Show, a series of television specials on TNN. Haggard also took a guest spot on Jones's 1998 song "It Just Doesn't Get Any Better Than This", which also features other country icons like Willie Nelson and Waylon Jennings.

Recording
Twenty-five years after their last album, Jones and Haggard took a different approach in 2006, each singing five songs originally recorded by the other, then teaming up for four full-fledged duets. One of these is the title track, which chronicles the tales of an aging country singer, a song clearly intended to appear somewhat autobiographical for these two legends (when Haggard appeared on Jones's television show, Jones requested that Haggard sing a verse of it and called it his favorite Hag song).

Jones had previously recorded Haggard's early hit "All My Friends Are Strangers" when he was on the Musicor record label in the 1960s. Haggard had recorded Jones's smash "She Thinks I Still Care" on his 1969 album A Portrait of Merle Haggard.

Kickin' Out The Footlights...Again would be the final proper studio album recorded by Jones before his death in 2013.

Reception

The album reached number 25 on the Billboard country albums chart and received positive reviews, although many critics took note of Jones's increasingly withered voice. Stephen Thomas Erlewine of AllMusic wrote "Of the two, George sounds a bit worse for wear—his voice is a little thin and slightly scratchy—but even if their age is evident... the album also illustrates exactly why Jones and Haggard are two of the greatest vocalists in country music history." Music critic Robert Christgau wrote "Hag keeps getting Haggier, but that thing in George's voice that was grainy like cornbread is turning to mush."

Track listing

Personnel

 Merle Haggard – vocals, guitar
 George Jones – vocals
 Norm Hamlet – pedal steel guitar
 Eddie Bayers – drums
 Doug Colosio – piano
 Hargus "Pig" Robbins – piano
 Stuart Duncan – fiddle, mandolin
 Larry Franklin – fiddle
 Paul Franklin – steel guitar 
 Scott Joss – guitar
 Liana Manis – background vocals
 Brent Mason – acoustic & electric guitar 
 John Wesley Ryles – background vocals
 Marty Slayton – background vocals
 Keith Stegall – Producer
 Norman Stevens – guitar
 Rhonda Vincent – background vocals
 Bruce Watkins – acoustic guitar
 Kevin Williams – bass
 Glenn Worf – bass

Production
 Merle Haggard – producer
 Keith Stegall – producer
 Lou Bradley – producer, engineer
 Susan Nadler – executive producer
 Evelyn Shriver – executive producer
 Matt Rovey – engineer, assistant engineer
 Jason Campbell – production coordination
 Michael Campbell – project manager
 John Kelton – engineer, mixing
 Matt Lumpkin – photography
 Nancy Jones – photography
 Jerry Jordan – photography
 Todd Tilwell – assistant engineer
 David Gulliver – assistant engineer
 Nathan Dickinson – assistant engineer
 Hank Williams – mastering

References

2006 albums
George Jones albums
Merle Haggard albums
Vocal duet albums
Albums produced by Keith Stegall